The Canadian rock band Theory of a Deadman has released seven studio albums, one extended play (EP), thirty-seven singles, and twenty-six music videos. The band was formed in 1999 in Delta, British Columbia, by Tyler Connolly (lead vocals and guitars), Dave Brenner (guitar), Dean Back (bass), and former member Tim Hart (drums). They had been through multiple drummers before recruiting current member Joey Dandeneau in 2009.

Nickelback's Chad Kroeger signed the group to his record label, 604 Records, in 2001 after Connolly gave Kroeger's ex-girlfriend a copy of their demo, and the following year, Theory of a Deadman released their eponymous debut album. The record was certified platinum by Music Canada (MC; formerly known as the Canadian Recording Industry Association) and peaked at numbers four and eighty-five on the Billboard Canadian Albums and US Billboard 200 charts, respectively. Their next album, Gasoline, was released in 2005.

In 2008, the band released their third studio album, Scars & Souvenirs, which spawned several successful singles, including "Not Meant to Be", "Bad Girlfriend", "All or Nothing", and "Hate My Life". Three of these songs were on the Billboard Hot 100 and have been the only singles to be seen on this particular chart. The album was certified platinum by both MC and the Recording Industry Association of America (RIAA), and was on the Billboard 200 chart for 110 weeks, peaking at number twenty-six. It also won the Western Canadian Music Award for "Rock Recording of the Year" in 2009.

Subsequent albums The Truth Is... (2011) and Savages (2014) both peaked on the Billboard 200 at number eight and appeared on the UK Albums chart, reaching numbers 68 and 41, respectively. The band recorded their first EP, Angel Acoustic EP, in 2015. Wake Up Call was released in October 2017 with the lead single, "Rx (Medicate)" (a song addressing the opioid epidemic in Canada and the United States), reaching number one on the Billboard Mainstream Rock chart and earning a "No. 1 Song Award" from the Society of Composers, Authors and Music Publishers of Canada (SOCAN).

The band released their thirty-seventh single "History of Violence" in 2019, and announced a release date of January 31, 2020, for their seventh studio album Say Nothing.

Studio albums

Extended plays

Singles

Notes

Promotional Singles

Music videos

Notes

References

External links
 
 Theory of a Deadman discography at AllMusic
 

Rock music group discographies
 
 
Discographies of Canadian artists